The Grand Falls Generating Station is a hydroelectric dam built on the Saint John River in Grand Falls in the Canadian province of New Brunswick and is operated by NB Power corporation. It was built in 1931 and its power house has a capacity of 66 megawatts with its 4 turbines.

References

External links

NB Power Corporation

Buildings and structures in Victoria County, New Brunswick
Dams in New Brunswick
Grand Falls, New Brunswick
Hydroelectric power stations in New Brunswick
NB Power
Dams completed in 1931
1931 establishments in New Brunswick